Escape from East Berlin is a 1962 American-West German thriller film directed by Robert Siodmak and starring Don Murray, Christine Kaufmann and Werner Klemperer.

It was shot at the Tempelhof Studios in Berlin. The film's sets were designed by the art director Dieter Bartels and Ted Haworth.

Plot
The story takes place in East Berlin soon after the Berlin Wall is built, and is based on an actual escape on January 24, 1962. Kurt Schröder is a chauffeur to East German Major Eckhardt and his seductive wife Heidi, with whom he is having an affair. One night he sees a friend, Günther Jurgens, who works at the garage where Kurt has the Major's car maintained, drive his tow-truck through a gate and get killed trying to escape to the west. Günther's sister, Erika, comes looking for Günther when he doesn't return, and is told that Kurt saw him last night. She then goes to Kurt's house, where he lives with his mother, Uncle Albrecht (a musician), sister Ingeborg and kid brother Helmut within sight of the wall. Erika is intent on escaping to West Berlin, thinking that her brother made it. Kurt, reasonably satisfied with his life, has no intention of risking his life to attempt an escape. Erika then attempts to escape over the wall but Kurt catches her as she tries to crawl under the barbed wire, and they pretend to be lovers to hide her intentions from suspicious guards. Kurt then hides her in his house. A piece of Erika's clothing is caught in the barbed wire, and the guards track her to the Schröder's house. She hides in a room without a floor, and narrowly escapes the guards after they conclude that she could not be in the room.

The Schröders and their neighbors, including a woman named Marga who has a baby and whose husband has already escaped to the west, want to escape East Germany. Kurt comes up with the idea of building a tunnel under the wall, through which they can escape to West Berlin. Although he will mastermind the plan, Kurt has no intention of going with them. They drill through the basement wall using Uncle Albrecht's band as a noise cover when the actual drilling takes place. One member of the family keeps watch while the others work on the tunnel itself. After they start digging the tunnel, they are joined by Walter Brunner, who had his own plan to dig a tunnel. All the while, Kurt is falling in love with Erika, and he eventually summons the courage to tell her that her brother is dead. Because of this burgeoning love, Kurt has changed his mind and will escape with the rest of his family and Erika. On January 27, 1962, the tunnel is completed when just before dawn Kurt reaches the other side, and the breakout is planned for the following night.

However, Marga tells Erika's parents the news of their daughter, and Erika's father, a professor who favors the Communist regime, betrays the escape plan to Major Eckhardt. Kurt is waiting to drive the Eckhardt's and learns from Heidi that the authorities are after him and he takes the car and hurries home ahead of the East German troops. When he arrives home, Kurt learns that his family have invited Uncle Albrecht's band members to join the escape, bringing the number of escapees to 28. Kurt tells them of the betrayal, and that they must make their escape immediately. As the police besiege their house, the Schröders, their friends and Erika make their escape, with Kurt bringing up the rear. He is wounded when a soldier fires at him as he goes through the tunnel collapsing it behind him. Erika comes back to find and help him. Together they make their way to the exit, where the others have already emerged to live in freedom.

Cast
 Don Murray as Kurt Schröder
 Christine Kaufmann as Erika Jurgens
 Werner Klemperer as Walter Brunner
 Ingrid van Bergen as Ingeborg Schröder
 Carl Schell as Major Eckhart
 Edith Schultze-Westrum as Mother Schröder
 Bruno Fritz as Uncle Albrecht
 Maria Tober as Marga
 Horst Janson as Günther Jurgens
 Kai Fischer as Heidi Eckhart
 Kurt Waitzmann as Prof. Thomas Jurgens
 Helma Seitz as Frau Jurgens
 Ronald Dehne as Helmut Schröder

Production
Since the building of the Berlin Wall in 1961 stories of escapes from the East, both failed and successful, had filled the news in the West and led to competition between US networks to record a tunnel escape. MGM decided to take advantage of the public interest with a feature film inspired by real events. This included building a 300 yard long plaster replica of the wall in West Berlin that became a tourist attraction and attracted the attention of East German guards. The movie crew filmed sentries flashing spotlights across the border, turning them into film extras and prompting director Robert Siodmak to rave “Talk about realism!"

Reception
According to MGM records, the film made a profit of $193,000.

References

External links
 
 
 
 

1962 films
West German films
English-language German films
Films shot in Berlin
Films shot at Tempelhof Studios
Films about the Berlin Wall
Cold War films
American films based on actual events
Films directed by Robert Siodmak
East Berlin
Metro-Goldwyn-Mayer films
1960s in Berlin
Films set in Berlin
Films set in East Germany
1960s English-language films
German films based on actual events
American drama films
German drama films
1960s American films
1960s German films